Ciorogârla is a commune in the southwestern part of Ilfov County, Muntenia, Romania. It is composed of two villages, Ciorogârla and Dârvari. The Ciorogârla River flows through this location; its name, of Slavic origin, means "murky stream".

Natives
 Marin Ion

References

Further reading
Magazin Istoric. "Ciorogârla, domeniul Samurcaș". no.7/2002

Communes in Ilfov County
Localities in Muntenia
Place names of Slavic origin in Romania